James Wei (born 1930) is an American chemical engineer.

Wei received his bachelor's degree from Georgia Institute of Technology in 1952, before pursuing graduate study at Massachusetts Institute of Technology, where he earned a master's and a doctor of science degree. He began working for Mobil Oil in 1955, and left the company in 1970 to accept the Allan P. Colburn Professorship of Chemical Engineering at the University of Delaware, where he taught until 1977. Wei returned to MIT the next year and remained affiliated with his alma mater until 1991, when he became dean of engineering at Princeton University and also served as Pomeroy and Betty Perry Smith Professor of Chemical Engineering. Wei stepped down as dean in 2002.

He was named a member of the National Academy of Engineering in 1978, credited with "advancement of chemical engineering by mathematical analysis of complex reaction of such analysis to commercial processes" and an academician of the Academia Sinica in 1982.

References

1930 births
Living people
American chemical engineers
American people of Chinese descent
Georgia Tech alumni
MIT School of Engineering alumni
Princeton University faculty
Members of Academia Sinica
Members of the United States National Academy of Engineering
Massachusetts Institute of Technology faculty
American university and college faculty deans
University of Delaware faculty
Chemical engineering academics
ExxonMobil people